Pedro Curvelo (born 14 April 1960) is a Portuguese sprinter. He competed in the 4 × 100 metres relay at the 1988 Summer Olympics and the 1992 Summer Olympics.

References

1960 births
Living people
Athletes (track and field) at the 1988 Summer Olympics
Athletes (track and field) at the 1992 Summer Olympics
Portuguese male sprinters
Olympic athletes of Portugal
Place of birth missing (living people)